McWatters is a surname. Notable people with the surname include:

Arnie McWatters, Canadian football player
Cheryl S. McWatters, Canadian academic
Donald McWatters (born 1941), Australian field hockey player
Eugene McWatters (born 1978), American serial killer
Stephen McWatters (1921–2006), English schoolteacher

See also
McWatters, Quebec, part of Rouyn-Noranda